Harro Adt (born 20 May 1942) is a German diplomat.

Life and career
Adt studied law in Tübingen, Munich and Freiburg; He passed his first state examination in 1969. In 1972 he passed the second state examination and then went into foreign service.

Adt was accredited in Kabul, Calcutta, Geneva, Paris and Brussels. In 2003, he was Ministerial Director of Monsieur Afrique in the government of Gerhard Schröder. He was later appointed ambassador to South Africa and then the Federal Government's Africa Commissioner.

After working as ambassador to Mali, he traveled again to the Malian capital Bamako on 22 July 2003, together with the then State Secretary Jürgen Chrobog, in order to work with the Malian government to find a solution to the hostage-taking in the Sahara.

Adt is the father of the German business executive Katrin Adt.

References

1942 births
Living people
People from Munich
20th-century German diplomats
21st-century German diplomats
Ambassadors of Germany to the Central African Republic
Ambassadors of Germany to South Africa